The Highwood Mountains are an island range (sub-range of the Rockies entirely surrounded by prairie) which cover approximately 4,659 km² (1,799 sq mi) of the Central Montana Alkalic Province in north central Montana in the U.S. They are in Chouteau, Judith Basin and Cascade counties  and lie east of Great Falls and Benton Lake National Wildlife Refuge, at the northern end of the Lewis and Clark National Forest. The mountains were included in Highwood Mountains National Forest until 1908, when the unit became part of Lewis and Clark National Forest.

Nearby are Highwood, Montana and the Missouri River above the mouth of the Marias River. The highest point in the Highwood Mountains is Highwood Baldy at 2338 meters (7670 ft).

The area has volcanic origins and is rich in potash. Many of the extrusive rocks and some of the dike rocks contain abundant phenocrysts of a clear analcime that appears to be primary. Pseudoleucite is an abundant constituent of many of the igneous rocks. The Shonkin Sag, a glacial meltwater channel, borders the Highwood Mountains to the north.

See also
 List of mountain ranges in Montana

Notes

Mountain ranges of Montana
Geology of Montana
Landforms of Chouteau County, Montana
Lewis and Clark National Forest